Kidepo Valley National Park is a  national park in the Karamoja region in northeast Uganda. Kidepo is rugged savannah, dominated by the  Mount Morungole and transected by the Kidepo and Narus rivers.

Location
Kidepo Valley National Park is located near Karenga in Kaabong District, in the northeastern corner of Uganda.

The northwestern boundary of the park runs along the international frontier with Bira, South Sudan and abuts against its Kidepo Game Reserve.

History
The Ketebo or Mening are the original inhabitants of the area, who had been living here since 1800. It was gazetted as a game reserve by the British colonial government in 1958, and the people were evicted. The purpose was both to protect the animals from hunting and to prevent further clearing of bush for tsetse fly-control. The eviction of the resident people and the resultant famine, especially the Ketebo people who were forcefully relocated to other areas within Bira such as Napotpot, Kalo Kudo, Namosingo, Loriwo and Naurkori in South Sudan, was cited by park management as an example of the unacceptable consequences of not taking community needs into account when designating reserves.

The newly independent government of Uganda under Milton Obote converted the reserve into the Kidepo Valley National Park in 1962. The first chief warden of the park was Ian Ross, a Briton. In 1972, Paul Ssali, a Ugandan, replaced him. Their handover and training was the subject of the 1974 American documentary film, "The Wild and the Brave."

Geology
The park consists of the two major valley systems of the Kidepo and Narus Rivers.

Kanangorok (also spelled Kananorok or Kanatarok) is a tepid hot spring in the extreme north of the park, in Lotukei, South Sudanese boundary. This spring is the most permanent source of water in the park.

The soil in the park is clayey. In the Kidepo Valley, black chalky clay and sandy-clay loam predominate, while the Narus Valley has freer-draining red clays and loams.

Wildlife

Most of the park is open tree savannah.

Narus Valley
Narus is a name given by the Ketebo or Mening or Amening Clan which were the people living in the Valley. Primary grasses in the Narus Valley are the shorter red oat grass and taller bunchy Guinea grass and fine thatching grass. Common trees in the drier areas are red thorn acacias, desert dates, and to a lesser extent drumstick trees. The iconic sausage trees and fan palms line the water courses. Euphorbia candelabrum and the shorter monkey bread (or camel's foot) and Buffalo thorn trees are also found. 
Perennial water makes River Kidepo an oasis in the semi-desert which hosts over 86 mammal species including spotted hyena, lion, cheetah, leopard, wild dog, elephant, giraffe, zebra, African buffalo, bat-eared foxes, Rothschild's giraffe — as well as almost 500 bird species.

Kidepo Valley
Streams in the Kidepo Valley are likewise dotted with palms. Higher areas have whistling thorn acacias bush.

Park management
The park is managed by the Uganda Wildlife Authority. The USAID as of August 2013 was financing the improvement of roads within the park.

Leadership
The administration of the park is led by a Chief Warden. This position has been held by the following wardens:
1958–1962 Tony Henley
1964–1972 Ian Ross
ODUR first black African to be chief park warden managed Kidepo in the 1960s before Paul Ssali
1972– ? Paul Ssali
 –1981 A.M.K. Bendebule (died in air crash in the park)
 1994– Peter Lotyang
 1996 Anjelo Ajoka
 1998 (acting) Daniel Aleper
 2001-2002 Joseph Sentongo
2003-2006 Kuloao Okwongo
Edward Asalu as chief park warden
Capt. John Emille Otekat also worked as chief park warden 
 2008 Henry Tusubira
2013 Johnson Masereka
2021 Samuel Amanya

Finances
In the fiscal year 2009-2010 Kidepo received USh 294 million (US$129,000 or €99,000 as of August 1, 2010) from 2,100 visitors. By the 2012-2013 fiscal year this had grown to USh 466 million ($178,000 or €134,000 as of August 1, 2013) from 2300 visitors.

Conservation activity

Giraffe

During the 1960s Kidepo had a sustainable Rothschild giraffe population of over 400 animals. By 1992 this had been poached down to only three animals, including a single female. In 1997 Warden Peter Möller obtained funding from the Frankfurt Zoological Society to translocate giraffes from Kenya's Lake Nakuru National Park. One female died in the holding facility in Lake Nakuru. Two females and one male were flown to Kidepo. In Kidepo one male was eaten by lions shortly after being released.

Tourism
The park receives comparatively fewer tourists than Uganda’s other national parks. Game viewing is possible by vehicle on dirt roads that crisscross the southern and western parts of the park, other activities include nature walks, Lonyii summit hike, guided night drives and bird watching. A few trunk roads are improved with murram and are passable in all weather. The park’s remote location means the drive time for tourists from Kampala is an estimated 10 hours. The park is also connected by domestic flights from Entebbe International Airport, which land at Kidepo Airport. Tourist accommodations at the park include a rest camp run by the Uganda Wildlife Authority and other lodges.

References

External links

 Official government web page
 Kidepo Wildlife Foundation
 Kidepo Valley National Park

National parks of Uganda
Protected areas established in 1962
Kaabong District
1962 establishments in Uganda
Important Bird Areas of Uganda